Canna may refer to:

Places
 Canna, Western Australia, a locality in the Shire of Morawa, Australia
 Canna, Calabria, a comune in the Province of Cosenza, Italy
 Cannae, a frazione in the Province of Barletta-Andria-Trani, Apulia, Italy
 Canna, Scotland, an island in the Inner Hebrides

People
 Canna (name)
 Canna (gamer), (born 2000), League of Legends player
 Saint Canna, sixth-century mother of saints and nun in south Wales

Other uses
 Canna (plant), a genus of flowering plants
 Canna (unit), an ancient Italian length unit, equal to 2–3 m
 Canna Creek, a tributary to Lobutcha Creek, Mississippi
 MV Canna, a car ferry built for Caledonian MacBrayne
 Cannabis (also known as marijuana) a drug.

See also
 
 Cana (disambiguation)
 Cannae (disambiguation)
 Kanna (disambiguation)